Kenneth Sansom  may refer to:
Ken Sansom, American actor
Kenny Sansom, former English international footballer